Ghostly Desires is an erotic, full-motion video, adventure video game developed by CPV Productions and published by Spice Interactive for Microsoft Windows and Macintosh in 1995. It was  critically panned.

Reception 
Just Adventure negatively compared the game to Phantasmagoria, Kama Sutra, Druuna Morbis, Riana Rouge, and Erotica Island, describing it as a "blatant rip-off" of The 7th Guest with nude staff, where players walk from one porn scene to another; the reviewer ultimately gave the game an F rating. Quandaryland had similar sentiments, describing the game as an excuse to watch porn, giving it half a star.

References 

1995 video games
Erotic video games
Classic Mac OS games
Video games developed in the United States
Windows games